Doune is a remote hamlet on the south bank of the River Oykel, situated 2 miles west of Rosehall and 5 miles east of Lubcroy, in Sutherland, Scottish Highlands and is in the Scottish council area of Highland.

References

Populated places in Sutherland